Kuttner is a German surname. Notable people with the surname include:

Amita Kuttner (born 1990), Canadian astrophysicist and politician
Brian Kuttner mathematician
Erika Kuttner-Perreau
Henry Kuttner (1915–1958)  American author of science fiction, fantasy and horror
Josua Heschel Kuttner (c.1803 – 1878), Jewish Orthodox scholar and rabbi
Kurt Küttner (1907–1964) German SS officer
Robert Kuttner, American journalist and writer
Robert E. Kuttner (1927–1987)  American biologist
Sarah Kuttner (born 1979) German presenter and writer
Stuart Kuttner (born 1939 or 1940), former newspaper editor
Stephan Kuttner (1907-1996), German law expert

See also
Henry Kuttner deities supernatural entities created for the Cthulhu Mythos universe 
Sarah Kuttner – Die Show, German television talk show
Kutner, a surname
Küttner, a surname

German-language surnames